Clyde's is a play by Lynn Nottage that opened on Broadway on November 23, 2021, and closed on January 16, 2022, at the Hayes Theater. The production was directed by Kate Whoriskey and starred Uzo Aduba, Ron Cephas Jones, Edmund Donovan, Reza Salazar, and Kara Young.

Plot summary

Simulcast 
On November 22, 2021, Second Stage Theater announced that Clyde's would be live streamed from January 4 to 16 of 2022. It was captured by five to seven cameras mounted by Assemble Stream.

Awards and nominations

Original Broadway production

References 

2021 plays
Broadway plays
Plays by Lynn Nottage